Mazzon is a surname. Notable people with the surname include:

 Giorgio Mazzon (born 1960), English footballer
 Hervé Mazzon (born 1959), French volleyball player

See also
 Mazzone
 Mazzoni